Acantholambrus is an extinct genus of crab. It contains the single species Acantholambrus baumi, and was named by Blow and Manning in 1996.

References

External links
 Acantholambrus at the Paleobiology Database

Crabs
Eocene crustaceans
Fossils of the United States
Monotypic crustacean genera
Taxa named by Raymond B. Manning